Men's 63 kg competition in judo at the 1972 Summer Olympics in Munich, West Germany was held at Judo and Wrestling Hall.  In the gold medal match Bakhvain Buyadda of Mongolia, an unknown and very inexperienced judoka, lost to Takao Kawaguchi.  Several days later, Buyadda became the first Olympic judoka with a positive result for doping.  His medal was removed, but the other athletes were not moved and second place is considered vacant.

Results

Finals

Repechages

Pool A

Pool B

References

External links
  Official reports of the 1972 Summer Olympics

Judo at the 1972 Summer Olympics
Judo at the Summer Olympics Men's Lightweight